{|
{{Infobox ship image
|Ship image=
}}

|} USS Richard M. McCool Jr. (LPD-29)''' is the 13th and final Flight I  of the United States Navy. She is named after US Navy officer and Medal of Honor recipient Richard M. McCool, Jr. Richard M. McCool Jr. is under construction by Ingalls Shipbuilding in Pascagoula, Mississippi. She was christened on 11 June 2022.

Design
Richard M. McCool Jr. incorporates the changes that will be introduced in Fort Lauderdale intended to reduce the cost compared to the San Antonio-class, including: simplified bow works, replacement of the forward and aft composite masts with steel masts, removal of structures from the boat valley, and a stern gate which is open at the top. In addition, unlike Fort Lauderdale, Richard M. McCool Jr.'' will use the Enterprise Air Surveillance Radar (EASR) volume air search radar.

References 

 

San Antonio-class amphibious transport docks
Proposed ships of the United States Navy
2022 ships